The Oskemen Hydroelectric Power Plant (Óskemen GES), also known as Ust-Kamenogorsk Hydroelectric Power Plant, is a hydroelectric power plant on the Irtysh River near Oskemen in East Kazakhstan Province of Kazakhstan. It has 4 individual turbines with a nominal output of 82.8 MW (one renewed - 91 MW) with a generating capacity of 339.4 MW and generates 1.58 billion kilowatt-hours of electricity per year. It is owned and operated by AES Corporation.

See also

 List of power stations in Kazakhstan

References

Hydroelectric power stations in Kazakhstan
Hydroelectric power stations built in the Soviet Union
Dams on the Irtysh River
AES Corporation